The 1917–18 Army Cadets men's ice hockey season was the 15th season of play for the program.

Season
During World War I the team brought back former team captain and then-army Captain Joseph Viner to lead the team. Due to the requirements of the war, many students who were close to graduating were pressed into service as student officers in 1917. This had a secondary effect of depleting the ice hockey team of much of its experience. As a result, sophomore cadet Henry Nichols was named captain.

Because of the war, many of Army's contemporaries had suspended their programs and left the program scrambling to fill its schedule. The team ended up playing as many secondary schools as colleges, finishing with a 6–3 mark.

Roster

Standings

Schedule and Results

|-
!colspan=12 style=";" | Regular Season

 † The Princeton squad was an informal team supported by students and did not officially represent the university in any capacity.

References

Army Black Knights men's ice hockey seasons
Army
Army
Army
Army